ClayFighter is a fighting/beat 'em up series of video games.  The series is noted for having character sprites rendered from clay-animated figures, and for having humorous parodies of other fighting games such as Street Fighter and Mortal Kombat.

ClayFighter: Tournament Edition  and ClayFighter: Sculptor's Cut were only released as rental games from Blockbuster LLC in the United States.

Recurring characters
Bad Mr. Frosty - appears in all five games in the series, as well as being the only character to appear on all the cover art
Blob - appears in all five games in the series
Bonker - appears in all five games in the series, but only playable in four
Hoppy  - appears in three games in the series
Ickybod Clay - appears in four games in the series
Taffy - appears in all five games in the series, but only playable in four
Tiny - appears in three games in the series

Games

ClayFighter (Super NES, Genesis)
ClayFighter: Tournament Edition (Super NES)
ClayFighter 2: Judgment Clay (Super NES)
ClayFighter 63⅓ (Nintendo 64)
ClayFighter: Sculptor's Cut (Nintendo 64)
 ClayFighter: Call of Putty (WiiWare and DSiWare), cancelled

References

Video game franchises introduced in 1993
Fighting games
2D fighting games
3D fighting games
Interplay Entertainment games
Video game franchises
Clay animation
Fantasy parodies
Parody video games
Video games developed in the United States